The Torneo Internazionale Femminile Antico Tiro a Volo is a tournament for professional female tennis players played on outdoor clay courts. The event is classified as a $60,000 ITF Women's Circuit tournament. It was held in Rome, Italy, from 2005 to 2011 with the exception of 2009. The event was not held from 2012 to 2014, but it reappeared in 2015. The event was previously a $100,000, $75,000 and $25,000 tournament.

Past finals

Singles

Doubles

External links 
 Official website 
 ITF search

ITF Women's World Tennis Tour
Hard court tennis tournaments
Tennis tournaments in Italy
Recurring sporting events established in 2005